Eagle was a brand of the Chrysler Corporation following the purchase of American Motors Corporation (AMC) in 1987 and marketed through the end of the 1998 model year. It was aimed at the enthusiast driver and promoted as more "European" than the automaker's similar models.

The "Eagle" name was taken by Chrysler from the four-wheel drive AMC Eagle models that were introduced for the 1980 model year. This was the last of American Motors' wholly U.S.-designed vehicles and one of the first modern mass-production crossover vehicles. The Eagle name also appeared on a number of Jeep trim packages and special models that included the J-10 pickup trucks, the wide-track Cherokee SJ, as well as the CJ-5 and CJ-7 models starting in 1976.

A variety of imported and domestic-built vehicles were marketed, mostly by former AMC dealers along with Jeep products, until the brand was discontinued in 1998. Though short-lived, the Eagle Vision sedan sold in respectable numbers, while the sporty Eagle Talon sold more than 115,000 units.

Origin
Following the introduction of General Motors' Saturn brand automobile, Chrysler promised a similar new brand designed to take Saturn on with innovative design and building methods. In a press release by then Chrysler Chairman Lee Iacocca, it was indicated that Chrysler was working on a car that would bow as the "Liberty". However, these plans never reached fruition. The name later was used for a Jeep model.

The main objective of Chrysler acquiring American Motors was the long-established Jeep vehicles, but Renault forced the company to take on the contractual obligations of the passenger car models as part of the deal. Another major factor was that, due to state franchise laws, Chrysler could not start selling Jeeps through their existing dealer networks, nor could ex-AMC dealers begin to sell other Chrysler products. Thus, the Eagle marque was born.

Under new ownership, Chrysler quickly discontinued the domestic-built front-wheel drive Alliance and Encore that were developed under Renault, but continued to build the four-wheel drive AMC Eagle crossover. It was now called Eagle Wagon and marketed into the 1988 model year until production ended in December. This meant the Brampton Assembly (AMC) manufacturing capacity could be used for making more Jeeps. Moreover, Chrysler kept AMC's long-established Eagle brand by continuing to import the mid-sized Renault 21 (now named Eagle Medallion) as well as starting production of the Renault 25-based full-size sedan that was developed by AMC (now named Eagle Premier).

Marketing
To consolidate the marketing and maintain distribution through AMC dealerships following the 1987 acquisition, the Jeep/Eagle division of Chrysler Corporation was formed. Chrysler's initial problem was that unlike the Big Three, which had multiple brands under their corporate name, American Motors had sold passenger cars under its corporate initials of "AMC" since 1970. Thus, without having a separate brand from the now-defunct company, Chrysler looked to re-brand the legacy vehicles inherited through the purchase of AMC under the Eagle name instead of trying to fold those outside-designed products into Chrysler's existing branch structure (which, as mentioned, was unable to be done at the time).

Unlike Chrysler, Dodge, and Plymouth branded automobiles, the Eagle models lacked the Chrysler Corporation "pentastar" logo. Instead, all models prominently featured the Eagle head logo, seen at the top right.

Two of Eagle's first models, the Eagle Premier and the Eagle Medallion, were designed by AMC in cooperation with its former corporate partner (and 46.4 percent owner), Renault. The remainder of the brand's cars were simply rebadged versions of cars sold by other Chrysler Corporation divisions, as well as some captive imports produced by Mitsubishi Motors.

Throughout its history, the Eagle brand suffered from a lack of product recognition, although its Premier was technically more advanced than anything offered by Chrysler. Most of Eagle's models were offered in Chrysler-Plymouth, Dodge, and Mitsubishi dealerships under different guises. Chrysler was in the midst of financial difficulty at the end of the 1980s and did not have the funds to spread to its new automotive division. Moreover, Jeep vehicles were quite popular and profitable, so most of the division's marketing resources flowed to the Jeep product range. Since Jeep's products had better recognition and higher profit margins, many dealers placed greater emphasis on Jeeps, and considered the Eagle line of passenger cars to be a distraction to that business. Their sales and service expertise was primarily in the four-wheel drive Jeeps and AMC's Eagle all-wheel-drive models.

Furthermore, following Chrysler's acquisition of AMC, there was a realignment of the dealership network. Some former AMC/Jeep dealers were consolidated with Chrysler-Plymouth franchises. Up to this point, Chrysler-Plymouth outlets did not have a sport utility vehicle (SUV) to sell, and adding the Jeep line helped dealers offer customers a range of vehicles in a rapidly growing market segment. The merger may have helped the individual dealerships that signed on, but it caused the nascent Eagle division and its largely derivative models to compete unfavorably for attention with Chrysler's and Plymouth's often similar, but longer-established and better-recognized, lines of passenger cars.

Phase out
The Eagle brand was phased out in stages. In 1996, Chrysler discontinued the Mitsubishi Mirage-based Eagle Summit, having canceled the nearly identical Dodge Colt and Plymouth Colt models after the 1994 season. After a decade of slow sales, Chrysler announced the discontinuation of the Eagle brand in September 1997, and the last 1998 Eagle Talon rolled off the line shortly thereafter. In 1997, the Eagle Vision was discontinued at the end of its design cycle, though the similar Dodge Intrepid and Chrysler Concorde were redesigned for 1998 and continued through 2004. Only the Mitsubishi Eclipse-based Eagle Talon remained for 1998, after which it, along with the Eagle brand itself, was discontinued.

Chrysler had originally planned to redesign the Eagle Vision for 1999. Prototypes, called the VanCuren Eagle were even spotted wearing the Eagle logo, and Vision production continued into September 1997 to provide dealers with enough stock of the older car to carry them through to the new car's introduction. However, Chrysler executives decided to pull the plug on the Eagle brand just a few months later. The car they were working on went on to be marketed as the Chrysler 300M.

The AMC name disappeared with Chrysler's acquisition of the independent automaker, "but the Eagle name carried on, worn by various Renault- and Mitsubishi-sourced models through the ‘90s, when it was finally retired in 1998." Those Eagle cars failed because the automaker did not have a coherent marketing strategy for the mix of models and they also lacked effective promotional efforts in the automotive marketplace. In the end, "Chrysler wasn't fully committed to the nameplate and also left consumers confused about what an Eagle was -- if they knew the name at all."

Eagle cars marketed by Chrysler

 Eagle Wagon (1988)
The continuation of the AMC Eagle line after Chrysler acquired AMC in only the station wagon body style. Production of the crossover vehicle ended on December 14, 1987. According to the National Automobile Dealers Association NADA Guide, Chrysler's "Eagle was spawned from the buyout of American Motors and their AMC Eagle model."
 Eagle Medallion (1988–1989)
Also badged as the Renault Medallion in 1987, this car was imported and was very similar to the Renault 21.
 Eagle Premier (1988–1992)
Designed by AMC, the Premier was briefly badged as the Renault Premier prior to launch. Unusual (for an FWD car) in having a north–south engine mounting (to accommodate a future AWD version), it shared several parts with the Renault 25, and spawned a rebadged version named Dodge Monaco (1990–1992); this platform was the basis for the 1993 LH cars.
 Eagle Vista (1988–1992)
Two models were offered. The 3-door hatchback and 4-door sedan were rebadged Mitsubishi Mirages, and the station wagon (badged as either an Eagle Vista, or a Dodge/Plymouth Colt Vista) was a rebadged Mitsubishi Chariot. Sold only in Canada.
 Eagle Summit (1989–1996)
Coupe, sedan, and wagon models were available. The coupe and 1987-1991 sedans were rebadged Mitsubishi Mirages, while the wagon was a rebadged Mitsubishi Expo LRV. The 1991-1996 sedan was a rebadged Dodge/Plymouth Colt.
 Eagle Talon (1990–1998)
Similar to the Plymouth Laser and the Mitsubishi Eclipse, the Talon was Eagle's halo car and outsold its Plymouth cousin. (see also Diamond Star Motors)
 Eagle 2000GTX (1991–1992)
A rebadged Mitsubishi Galant, sold only in Canada.
 Eagle Vision (1993–1997)
One of Chrysler's three original LH-cars. Sold in Europe as the Chrysler Vision.

Concept car
The Eagle Optima was a 1990 concept car. It was a four-door sedan that used cab forward design and was powered by an experimental, 32-valve all-aluminum V8 engine with all-wheel drive.

It was one of a series of concepts (which included the 1987 Lamborghini Portofino and the 1989 Chrysler Millennium) that led up to the 1993 LH Eagle Vision and its siblings.

The Optima's front fascia also inspired that of the 1995-1998 Eagle Talon.

References

External links
 Official website (archived)

Chrysler
Car manufacturers of the United States
Motor vehicle manufacturers based in Michigan
Defunct motor vehicle manufacturers of the United States
Companies based in Oakland County, Michigan
Luxury motor vehicle manufacturers
Vehicle manufacturing companies established in 1988
Vehicle manufacturing companies disestablished in 1998
American brands
Defunct manufacturing companies based in Michigan